Ancylolomia caffra is a moth in the family Crambidae. It was described by Zeller in 1877. It is found in South Africa, where it has been recorded from the Western Cape.

References

Endemic moths of South Africa
Ancylolomia
Moths described in 1877
Moths of Africa